Danville Historic District is a national historic district located in Danville, Montour County, Pennsylvania. It encompasses 291 contributing buildings, 3 contributing sites, and 1 contributing object in the central business district and surrounding residential areas of Danville.  The buildings mostly date from the 1840s to the early 20th century.  The district incorporates the previously listed and predominantly residential Danville West Market Street Historic District.  Residential buildings are mostly of brick and frame construction, with some log and stone dwellings, and in a variety of architectural styles including Italianate, Federal, Queen Anne and Second Empire.  It includes the separately listed General William Montgomery House and Thomas Beaver Free Library and Danville YMCA.  Other notable non-residential buildings include the Montour County Courthouse (1871), Mahoning Presbyterian Church (1853), Pine Street Lutheran Church (c. 1860), Eli Trego Building, Heim Suspender Factory (1835), First Ward School (c. 1870), Bnai Zion Temple (c. 1865), and Jemima Donaldson's Cross Keys Tavern (c. 1812).

It was added to the National Register of Historic Places in 1994.

References

Historic districts on the National Register of Historic Places in Pennsylvania
Buildings and structures in Montour County, Pennsylvania
National Register of Historic Places in Montour County, Pennsylvania